Shahzada Mirza Sultan Muhammad Suhrab Hindi Bahadur  (1820 – ) also known as Mirza Mendhu Sahib was a son of Mughal emperor Bahadur Shah II and Moti Bai.

After the Indian Mutiny 1857–1858, he became a dervish (Sufi aspirant) in Udaipur where the Maharana of Mewar granted him a small subsistence pension.

References

1820 births
1889 deaths
Mughal princes
19th-century Indian Muslims
Indian nobility
Indian Sufis